Rosa Anne Freedman,  who has written as Rosa Davis, is a British professor of law, conflict, and global development at the University of Reading. Her principal area of research is the activities of the United Nations as they relate to human rights. She has given evidence before the Foreign Affairs Select Committee of the House of Commons of the United Kingdom about the human rights work of the Foreign and Commonwealth Office, and to the Scottish Government relating to gender questions on the national census.

Early life
Rosa Freedman was born in 1983. She has spoken openly about being a survivor of sexual violence. She acquired her Bachelor of Laws (LLB) at Queen Mary University of London (2002–2005), and her Master of Laws (LLM) at University College London (2005–06). She took the Bar Vocational Course at City University of London in 2006–07 and qualified as a barrister of Gray's Inn. She acquired her PhD in law at Queen Mary University of London in 2011 for a thesis on the United Nations Human Rights Council.

Career
Freedman was a senior lecturer at the University of Birmingham from 2014 to 2016 before becoming professor of law, conflict, and global development at the University of Reading in 2016. Her first book was The United Nations Human Rights Council: A Critique and Early Assessment, based on her PhD research, and published by Routledge in 2013. In 2014, she published a further book relating to her research titled Failing to Protect: The UN and the Politicisation of Human Rights.

In June 2018, she gave evidence before the Foreign Affairs Select Committee of the House of Commons about the human rights work of the Foreign and Commonwealth Office. Also in 2018, in her response to the Scottish Government's proposal to change gender rules in the national census, she warned that "conflating sex and gender identity will undermine sex as a separate category protected by law".

She spoke at an event at the Edinburgh Law School, which attracted media coverage for the perceived trans-exclusionary views advanced by Freedman and other speakers, including Jo Phoenix. In December 2018, she described receiving abuse on the basis of her continuing opposition to transgender rights.

Freedman was invited to take part in an event at University of Essex in 2020 as part of the University’s Holocaust Memorial Week event. The invitation was effectively rescinded at short notice. Following advice from a barrister that suggested the university may have acted unlawfully, she received an apology from the university.

Selected publications
 The United Nations Human Rights Council: A Critique and Early Assessment. Routledge, Abingdon, 2013. 
 Failing to Protect: The UN and the Politicisation of Human Rights. Hurst & Company, London, 2014.

References

External links 

Living people
Academics of the University of Reading
British legal scholars
Alumni of University College London
Alumni of Queen Mary University of London
Jewish women
English Jews
British women academics
English barristers
Women legal scholars
Year of birth missing (living people)